The  Intermediate-Current Stability Experiment, or ICSE, was a magnetic fusion energy reactor designed by the UKAEA ("Harwell") design team. It was intended to be the follow-on design to the ZETA, incorporating a high-speed current pulse system that was expected to improve the stability of the plasma and allow fusion reactions to take place. Construction began in 1959, starting with its building known as "D-1", but Harwell's new director expressed concerns about some of the theoretical assumptions being made about the design, the project was canceled in August 1960. Parts that were already built were scavenged by other teams.

History

ZETA and ZETA II
The Harwell fusion team completed construction of the ZETA reactor in August 1957. This was the world's first truly large-scale fusion device, both in size and in terms of the power fed into the plasma. After the machine proved stable, the teams began introducing deuterium fuel into the mix, and immediately noticed neutrons being released. Neutrons are the most easily seen results of fusion reactions, but the team was highly cautious due to several warnings of non-nuclear neutrons from teams in the US and USSR. A series of diagnostic "shots" through September and October were used to characterize the plasma. Spectrographic analysis of the plasma taken through small windows in the reactor's torus suggested the plasma was at a temperature of somewhere between 1 and 5 million degrees, which then-current theory suggested would cause a fusion rate within a factor of two of what was being measured. It appeared the neutrons were indeed from fusion events.

The apparent success led to plans for a much larger follow-on reactor known as ZETA II. The goal of ZETA had been to generate low levels of fusion reactions, the goal for ZETA II was to produce so many reactions that the energy they released would be greater than the energy fed into the system, a condition known as "break even" or Q=1. To reach these energy levels, the reactor would have to be much larger and more powerful than the original ZETA, and it would be difficult to find room for it at Harwell. The need for more room led to John Cockcroft suggesting it be moved to the new Winfrith location, arguing that it was a prototype for a commercial machine, like the other reactors being built there. This was highly contentious; many members of the fusion team at Harwell were uninterested in moving and argued that losing the theoretical support at Harwell would be an enormous problem. The matter came to a head in a mid-January 1958 meeting which did not go smoothly.

But any anger over the issue of choosing a site for ZETA II was completely overshadowed by the impending announcement of the ZETA results. This took place on Saturday 22 January 1958, with careful wording to note that the source of the neutrons had not yet been verified and it was not sure that they were from fusion. However, the assembled press reporters were not happy with these statements and continued to press Cockcroft on the issue. He eventually stated that in his own opinion they were 90% likely to be due to fusion. The reporters took this as a statement of fact, and the Sunday papers all claimed that fusion had been successfully achieved. A press release from the UKAEA to the contrary was largely ignored, and concerns expressed by researchers from other countries were dismissed as jingoism.

However, further research on ZETA demonstrated the neutrons were indeed not from fusion. Cockcroft was forced to publish a humiliating retraction in May, and the ZETA II plans were thrown into disarray.

References

Fusion power